Westfield Junction is a railway switching junction on the Auckland railway network in New Zealand.

Westfield Junction defines the southernmost extremity of the North Auckland Line (NAL) via Penrose and the point where the North Island Main Trunk (NIMT) line via Glen Innes intersects with the NAL. The NIMT continues south from Westfield Junction toward Otahuhu and Papakura.

Two suburban passenger train services pass through Westfield Junction: Southern Line services between Papakura and Britomart, and Eastern Line services between Manukau and Britomart. The junction is also used by Northern Explorer services between Wellington and Auckland, excursion passenger trains, and freight trains.

Westfield station, a few hundred metres south of Westfield Junction, was closed in March 2017.

See also
List of Auckland railway stations

References

Rail transport in Auckland
Public transport in Auckland
Rail junctions in New Zealand